Azad Kashmir, part of the former princely state of Jammu and Kashmir, is an autonomous state of Pakistan. The history of the region dates back to thousands of years. A survey team in 2014 recorded around 100 archaeological sites in the region dating back to Mughal, Sikh, and Dogra rule.

List
Following is an incomplete list of cultural heritage sites in Azad Kashmir, Pakistan.

|}

References

Archaeological sites in Pakistan
Buildings and structures in Azad Kashmir